Sir Dieter Robin Helm  (born 11 November 1956) is a British economist and academic.

Career
Helm is Professor of Energy Policy at the University of Oxford, and Fellow in Economics at New College, Oxford.

He was a member of the Economics Advisory Group to the British Secretary of State for Energy and Climate Change, and Chair of the Natural Capital Committee.

His research interests include energy, utilities, and the environment.

Helm was knighted in the 2021 New Year Honours for services to the environment, energy and utilities policy.

The Carbon Crunch
In his book The Carbon Crunch (2012) and in print media, Dieter Helm criticised efforts to reduce greenhouse gas emissions through current regulation and government intervention, and the deployment of renewable energy, particularly wind power.

He recommended establishing a carbon tax and carbon border tax, increased funding for research and development, and an increased use of gas for electricity generation to substitute coal and to act as a bridge to new technologies.

Net Zero
In 2021 his book Net Zero was shortlisted for the Wainwright Prize in the Global Conservation Writing category.

Works

Books
As author
Net Zero: How We Stop Causing Climate Change (September 2020), Harper Collins, .
Green and Prosperous Land (March 2019), William Collins, .
Burn Out: The Endgame for Fossil Fuels (March 2017), Yale University Press, .
Natural Capital: Valuing the Planet (May 2015), Yale University Press, .
The Carbon Crunch: How We're Getting Climate Change Wrong – and How to Fix it (September 2012), Yale University Press, .
Energy, the State, and the Market: British Energy Policy since 1979 (February 2004), revised edition, Oxford University Press, .

As editor
The Economics and Politics of Climate Change (October 2009), with Cameron Hepburn, .
The New Energy Paradigm (April 2007), .
Climate Change Policy (May 2005), .
Environmental Policy: Objectives, Instruments, and Implementation (November 2000), .
Competition in Regulated Industries (April 1998), with Tim Jenkinson, .
British Utility Regulation: Principles, Experience and Reform (September 1995), .
The Economic Borders of the State (December 1990), .
The Market for Energy (May 1989), with John Kay and David Thompson, .

Selected peer-reviewed articles
Helm, D., 2008. Climate-change policy: why has so little been achieved?. Oxford Review of Economic Policy, 24(2), pp.211–238. JSTOR: 23606642; doi: 10.1093/oxrep/grn014
Helm, D., 2005. The assessment: the new energy paradigm. Oxford Review of Economic Policy, 21(1), pp.1–18. JSTOR: 23606814; doi: 10.1093/oxrep/gri001
Helm, D., 2002. Energy policy: security of supply, sustainability and competition. Energy policy, 30(3), pp.173–184. doi: 10.1016/S0301-4215(01)00141-0

See also

Global warming
Climate change mitigation
Economics of global warming
Energy policy of the United Kingdom
Environmental economics

References

External links

Personal website
Natural Capital Committee Website

Living people
English economists
Fellows of New College, Oxford
Non-fiction environmental writers
1956 births
Commanders of the Order of the British Empire
Knights Bachelor